George Sutton Titheradge (9 December 1848 – 22 January 1916) was an English actor.

Biography
Titheradge was born at Portsea, Portsmouth, England, eldest son of George Robert Titheradge (an accountant) and Sarah Isabelle Emblim.  He made his first appearance on the stage at the Theatre Royal, Portsmouth, subsequently supported Charles Dillon in Shakespearian plays, and in 1873 played the junior lead at Bristol. In 1876 he was Joseph Surface in the Chippendale classical company, and in the same year played Hamlet at Calcutta. On 1 January 1877 he was the Herald at the Calcutta Durbar and proclaimed Queen Victoria Empress of India. He made his first appearance in London on 6 October 1877, and on 8 April 1878 played Iago to the Othello of Henry Forrester.

Titheradge visited India a second time and, going on to Melbourne, made his first appearance there in May 1879 as Lord Arthur Chilton in False Shame; F. H. Pollock also making his Australian debut. He joined the London Comedy Company at Sydney in 1880. After a world tour including the United States, Titheradge was engaged in 1883 by J. C. Williamson and Garner to come to Australia and play Wilfred Denver in The Silver King. He made a great success in this character, and in leading parts in other popular dramas of the period. He joined the Brough and Boucicault company in 1887, and for ten years played lead in plays by Robertson, Grundy, Jones, Pinero and other dramatists of the period. There was one Shakespearian production, Much Ado About Nothing, in which Titheradge was an excellent Benedick to the Beatrice of Mrs Brough.

Titheradge must have played something like 100 parts in Australia, not one without distinction, and many seemed almost faultless. Possibly his Aubrey Tanqueray and Village Priest returned most often to the memories of play-goers of the time. He went to London in 1898, and played with success with Mrs Patrick Campbell, including his old part of Aubrey Tanqueray, and was with her company in America in 1902, among his parts being Schwartze in Magda. In January 1903 he played Professor Rubeck at the Imperial Theatre, London, in Ibsen's When We Dead Awaken, and later in the year toured America with Henry Miller and Margaret Anglin in Camille, The Devil's Disciple, and other plays. He was in the United States again late in 1905, and toured with Sothern and Julia Marlowe.

In England in 1907 Titheradge was with Sir John Hare's company in Caste by Thomas W. Robertson and A Pair of Spectacles by Sydney Grundy.  He returned to Australia in 1908 and in that year and in 1909 played in The Thief, The Taming of the Shrew, The Village Priest, The Silver King, and other plays. There was a benefit performance for him in December 1910 at which George Rignold made his last appearance. During the remainder of his life Titheradge made only occasional appearances, among them being in The Village Priest, with Mrs Brough in 1912, Shylock to the Portia of Ellen Terry at her benefit at Sydney in 1914, and George II in a Lewis Waller production of A Fair Highwayman. He died at Sydney on 22 January 1916.

He married Isabella Maria Murdoch in 1871, and there were three children of the marriage. Following a divorce in 1884, he married Alma Saegert (stage name Alma Santon). They had a son and six daughters, of whom Madge Titheradge, born in Melbourne in 1887, made a reputation as an actress in London, playing many leading parts. The son, Dion Titheradge, born in Melbourne in 1889, after experience as an actor in Australia, U.S.A., and England, became well known as a producer and author of many plays and scenarios.

References

Further reading
Martha Rutledge, 'Titheradge, George Sutton (1848 - 1916)', Australian Dictionary of Biography, Volume 6, MUP, 1976, pp 279–280.

External links
 

1848 births
1916 deaths
English male stage actors
Australian male stage actors
Australian people of English descent